Brutus is a Czech rock band founded in 1967. They call their style "true bigbeat" (the Czech word bigbeat is different from the English use, and is more or less connected with 1960s rock and roll).

History
Brutus was established in 1967 under the name Mandragora in Rakovník. Its original members were Vlastimil Beneš, Libor Laun, Michal Pleska, Miloslav Černý, Zdeněk Havelka, Vladimír Lankaš, Václav Matějka, Ivan Mikšovic, Jindřich Průcha, Zdeněk Steidl, and Milan Tyburec. In 1973, their performances were banned by the Communist government and they started playing under the name Elektronik. The name was changed to Brutus in 1980 and there was a period (1982–1989) when they had to play as Kyklop. Since the Velvet Revolution in 1989, the band has again been called Brutus. They have played with UK Subs, TV Smith, Suzi Quatro, Dr. Feelgood, Zóna A, and No Name. They have also collaborated with The Vibrators.
The group appeared in the 1995 movie Indiánské léto by Saša Gedeon and the 2008 sitcom Comeback.

As of 2020, Brutus has had forty-nine members throughout its history.

Band members
Current members
 Vladimír Hasal - drums, vocals
 Alexander "Sáša" Pleska - vocals, keyboards, harmonica
 Michal Čerman - vocals
 Jan Prokop - vocals
 Pavel Fišar - drums
 Václav Trlica - guitar
 Jan Bitman - bass
 Milan Křížanovský - bass, vocals
 František Matějovský - saxophone, flute, vocals
 Zbyněk Šlajchrt - saxophone
 Jan Nový - saxophone

Founding members
 Vlastimil Beneš - bass, vocals
 Libor Laun - drums, vocals
 Michal Pleska - guitar, trumpet, vocals
 Miloslav Černý - guitar, harmonica, flute
 Zdeněk Havelka - guitar, vocals
 Vladimír Lankaš - guitar
 Václav Matějka - drums
 Ivan Mikšovic - guitar
 Jindřich Průcha - guitar
 Zdeněk Steidl - vocals
 Milan Tyburec - bass, vocals

Discography
Studio albums
 Třikrát denně akt (1991)
 Mám horečku (1992)
 Celý večer rock and roll (1994)
 Gorila (1995)
 Deme na to (1998)
 Dík za číslo (2005)
 To samozřejmě můžeš (2008)

Live albums
 Somráci - Live (1993)
 2011-05-28 Plasy (2011)

Compilations
 Best of Brutus (1997)
 Alko alkohol- Pozdní sběr 1999 (2009)

DVDs
 Alko alkohol- Pozdní sběr 1999 (2009)
 Brutus živě a nahlas (2017)

References

External links
 

Czechoslovak rock music groups
Czechoslovak Big Beat groups and musicians
1967 establishments in Czechoslovakia
Musical groups established in 1967